Dholiya is a village in the Ladnun Tehsil, in the Nagaur District of Rajasthan, India. Dholiya is approximately 18km from its nearby town Jaswantgrah and 26Km from Didwana. It is also called as white city due to its name, which signifies white.

Geography

Demographics
 India census, Dholiya had a population of 3,122. Males constitute 1,603 of the population and females 1,519.

References

External links
Official website

Villages in Nagaur district